Pop Voodoo is the third studio album by British band Black Grape, released on 4 August 2017 through UMC. After a one-off show in 2010, Black Grape reunited to play a show in April 2015, by which point, they were being managed by Alan McGee. Following a tour of the United Kingdom and a collaboration with Paul Oakenfold, the band worked on a few ideas for new songs. They travelled to Spain in September 2016, initially as a writing trip, before it evolved into recording sessions for their next album. Recorded was done at Martin "Youth" Glover's residential studio in Sierra Nevada, Spain and in London. Pop Voodoo is a funk, pop and trip hop album that sees several instruments being played by Youth, alongside a variety of session musicians.

Pop Voodoo received generally favourable reviews from music critics, many of whom praised frontman Shaun Ryder's lyricism, the upbeat music and Youth's production work. It peaked at number eight in Scotland and number 15 in the UK. Preceded by a supporting slot for Richard Ashcroft on his UK tour, "Nine Lives" was released as the lead single from the album in June 2017. "I Wanna Be Like You" was then released as the album's second single the following month, ahead of festival appearances, such as Splendour and Rock Against Racism. After a performance at the Star Shaped Festival, the band went on a UK tour in late 2018.

Background and development
Following the demise of Happy Mondays, frontman Shaun Ryder formed Black Grape with Paul "Kermit" Leveridge, release two studio albums, It's Great When You're Straight...Yeah (1995) and Stupid Stupid Stupid (1997). They split up in 1998; Ryder reformed Happy Mondays, which later released their fifth studio album Uncle Dysfunktional (2007). Around 2009, Ryder conceived the idea of reuniting Black Grape, which amounted to a one-off show in 2010 with drum and bass musician Tom Piper covering Kermit's parts. Kermit did not participate as he was going through several personal issues, such as a health problem that required a pig's valve in his heart and his mother dealing with Alzheimer's disease. Ryder said no further plans had been made as their management had no interest in continuing with the band.

Veronica Gretton, former head of the band's previous label Radioactive Records, had emailed Ryder, telling him about the upcoming 20th anniversary of It's Great When You're Straight...Yeah. After a discussion with his wife in 2015, coupled with the contact from Gretton, Ryder decided to contact Kermit about reviving Black Grape, which he was enthusiastic about. This version of the band played their first show in several years in April 2015 at the Granada Studios in Manchester. By this time, Alan McGee, formerly the head of Creation Records, became the manager of both Black Grape and Happy Mondays. They embarked on a tour of the United Kingdom in June and July 2015. Happy Mondays had planned to work on another album, but progressed slowly due to the various opinions between members, and two of them living in separate countries from the others.

Writing and recording
In May 2016, NME reported that Black Grape were expected to make a new album in the near-future. The following month, Kermit and Ryder collaborated with DJs Paul Oakenfold and Goldie under the name Four Lions to release "We Are England", a football song to tie in with the 2016 Euros. During the making of the track, Ryder and Kermit worked on a few new ideas for new material. In September 2016, they travelled to Spain, where they initially planned to simply write more material for two weeks. They ended up had recording and mixing a new album across fours weeks, with producer Martin "Youth" Glover. Ten days were spent at Youth's residential studio in Sierra Nevada in Spain, while the rest of the time was spent in London completing it. When McGee had suggested Youth, Ryder was ecstatic about the prospect. Kermit was not aware of him, prompting Ryder to name off acts Youth worked with, such as Edwyn Collins and the Verve. Recording was handled by Michael Rendall, who was assisted by Jamie Grashion and Luke Fitzpatrick.

Ryder told Youth that they wanted to mesh the work of the Beach Boys, Bee Gees and Ghetto Boys. He said the three of them showed one another music they had not heard before, which effected the making of the album. Ryder said Youth pushed him and Kermit out of their comfort zone, such as doing backing vocals, which was something he did not typically do. Youth did programming and played Fender VI bass and guitar, while Rendall  also did programming and guitar, alongside keyboards. Various session musicians added extra instrumentation: Seth Leppard (guitar); Alex Ward (saxophone); Jamie Grashion (programming and guitar); Rainbow Man (harmonica); and Jackson Scott (acoustic guitar). Youth mixed the album, before it was mastered by Mike Marsh at The Exchange in Exmouth, Devon.

Composition and lyrics
Musically, the sound of Pop Voodoo has been described as funk, pop and trip hop. Discussing the music, Under the Radar writer Lily Moayeri said: "Fluid grooves and flirty funk interludes lace the Motown vibes and big band elements while baggy beats take dips into jazz and lounge territory". AllMusic reviewer Stephen Thomas Erlewine said Ryder "reverts to his old loves: '70s soul and disco, big beats and psychedelics, word games and singsong melodies". Nathan Westley of The Line of Best Fit found it to have "enough nods to Ryder's past [...] to suggest he hasn’t fully escaped the hard partying lifestyle that helped define his most beloved work". Ryder said they wanted to avoid mentioning God in the album's lyrics, as this had appeared in several of the songs on It's Great When You're Straight...Yeah. While Kermit would have his parts structured out on paper, Ryder would write random bits and work from that. When in the studio, Ryder said the pair would "sit face to face with each other, bouncing ideas off" one another. From here, they would have a song playing and ad-lib a part as it came to them. In his book How to Be a Rock Star (2021), Ryder regarded the album as the "proper Black Grape second album [...] the album that Stupid Stupid Stupid could have been".

The atmosphere of the album's opening track, "Everything You Know Is Wrong – Intro", was compared to the early work of De La Soul. A majority of the track was done by Youth after he had secretly taped Kermit and Ryder discussing American politics and Trump. Ryder said it was intended to be a skit that introduces the proceedings, akin to a hip hop album. It sees Ryder tackle the 2016 elections in the United States, as well as the Donald Trump administration. A comedian was employed to impersonate Trump's voice as Ryder said they would not be allowed to use his actual voice.
 It also includes a reference to the Hillary Clinton email controversy, with the noise of a dial-up modem connecting to the internet heard after it. The horn-laden "Nine Lives" is followed by "Set the Grass on Fire", a brass-enhanced track that touches on ska during the verse sections, recalling the work of Smash Mouth. The latter uses samples from "Waiting for My Baby" (1976) by De Franks and His Professionals.

"Whiskey, Wine and Ham" evoked "Summertime" (1991) by DJ Jazzy Jeff & the Fresh Prince; it features a beat similar to the one heard in "Funky Drummer" (1970) by James Brown, alongside an electric piano and samples of woodwind instruments. "Money Burns" is an electro-funk and trip hop track that recalled Pills 'n' Thrills and Bellyaches (1990)-era Happy Mondays. "String Theory" includes a banjo, and was reminiscent of "Reverend Black Grape" (1995) from their debut with its guitar and harmonica work. "Pop Voodoo" uses samples of "Ngyegye No So" by African Brothers Band. "I Wanna Be Like You" talks about a 74-year old man that continues to smoke weed. "Sugar Money" has doo-wop-esque backing vocals, while "Shame" is a funk song that Westley said has "snappy disco basslines collide [that] with dance rhythms". "Losing Sleep" was compared to "Loose Fit" by Happy Mondays.  Jim Gilchrist of The Scotsman wrote that "Young and Dumb", the album's closing track, was a "dubby clubland odyssey about the chemical highs and the comedown lows". Ryder said one of the track's reoccurring lines, "young, dumb and full of cum", was included as they wished to make a tribute to the work of Bushwick Bill.

Release
McGee and the staff at Universal thought they would deliver an average album; Ryder said after they heard the finished version, "it was like, ‘Fuckin’ hell!’ They were blown away". Black Grape embarked on a celebratory tour for the 21st anniversary of It's Great When You're Straight...Yeah in November and December 2016. In April 2017, the band supported Richard Ashcroft on his headlining arena tour of the UK. On 4 May 2017, Pop Voodoo was announced for release later in the year. Alongside this, "Everything You Know Is Wrong – Intro" was made available for streaming. Four days later, they played a one-off show in London at the 100 Club. Keyboardist Dan Broad and guitarist Mikey Shine, both of whom had been working with Happy Mondays since the early 2000s, aided Black Grape's live set. On 17 May 2017, a music video was released for "Pop Voodoo". "Nine Lives" was released as the lead single on 9 June 2017. The following month, they played a one-off show at Brixton Academy in London. "I Wanna Be Like You" was released as the second single from the album on 7 July 2017. Four days later, an animated lyric video for the song premiered through Clash website.

Following this, they appeared at the Splendour, Hope & Glory and Moovin festivals. Though originally scheduled for release on 7 July 2017, Pop Voodoo was eventually released on 4 August 2017 through UMC. The artwork was illustrated by Jon Gray; in his book Drawn to Type: Lettering for Illustrators, author Marty Blake found Gray's artwork "raw, compared to the whiff of elegance" of his other pieces, describing it in the style of Jean-Michel Basquiat. The word "pop" come across as eyes and a nose, while the word "voodoo" is laid over the mouth, resembling teeth. At the end of August, the band played at the Rock Against Racism event in Govanhill, Scotland. Ryder returned to Happy Mondays for a greatest hits tour to close out the year; as they took a break from live performances, Ryder spent the next two years focusing on Black Grape. Following an appearance at the Star Shaped Festival in September 2018, lack Grape went on another UK tour in November 2018.

Reception

Pop Voodoo was met with generally favourable reviews from music critics. At Metacritic, the album received an average score of 70, based on ten reviews. AnyDecentMusic? gave it an average score of 6.1, based on 13 reviews.

Erlewine felt Ryder's lyrics were "alternately provocative and embarrassing". Paul Moody of Classic Rock wrote that Ryder "remains in a league of his own" in terms of his lyricism. He said the "slapdash feel" only fails when the band "go off-piste," such as on "Pop Voodoo". musicOMH contributor Graeme Marsh said apart from the, "at times, laughable spiel spat by Ryder, there is one over-riding conclusion to take from Pop Voodoo – it is irrefutably 'catchy as fuck', as Ryder himself would no doubt say". The Independent head critic Andy Gill mentioned that Ryder's "best lyrics here accompany the best grooves," highlighting "Whiskey, Wine and Ham" as an example. Evening Standard Andre Paine wrote that after the opening track, Ryder "gradually rediscovers Black Grape’s unruly groove and seamy, surreal wordplay". They went on to say that Ryder was "some way off the height of his powers yet he remains a uniquely entertaining pop poet".  Westley said Ryder's "ever present lyrical wit is as sharp as it has ever been, but alas ultimately this album never matches his creative heights". April Clare Welsh of Crack felt that Ryder's words frequently "descend[ed] into absurdist territory"; Financial Times writer Ludovic Hunter-Tilney was disappointed in the lyrics as Ryder's "stream-of-consciousness verses were once a kind of bizarre street poetry but here they grow increasingly lacklustre".

Westley found it to have an "eminent celebratory spirit that lies at the centre of Black Grape's music, so it’s not surprising that the majority of this album is upbeat in nature". The Irish Times writer Lauren Murphy remarked that the "most surprising thing is that there are some half-decent (albeit unprogressive) songs here" but when "all is said and done, the voodoo here is negligible". PopMatters John Garratt thought it was an improvement over their previous album and Happy Mondays' last, praising Pop Voodoo as "12 solid grooves that drizzle the extra treats on top like a confection: not necessary, but really nice to have!" The Arts Desk writer Guy Oddy thought that while it did not match the quality of band's 1990s work, it was "considerably better than might be expected". He explained though that it could feel a "bit loose at times", it was "nothing but groovy vibes throughout, even if it does sometimes lack the heft of a proper backing band". In a review for The Sunday Times, author Lisa Verrico said many of the tracks would "work well live — surely the point? — but some of the song ideas are stretched to breaking point".

Matthew Shaw of Louder Than War saw it as one of "Youth's best production jobs" to date as the mix was "complex, fresh and full of sonic depth". Gill wrote that Youth helped "restore some of the verve and panache of Black Grape’s glorious debut album". Erlewine praised Youth for "burying Ryder in the mix, using his voice as just another aural element" as "it keeps the focus firmly on brightly dense rhythms". Moayeri said Rendall and Youth "should be credited with how well the superb compositions on Pop Voodoo flow", to which Jochen Overbeck of Musikexpress added: "Youth gives the whole thing some pop nuances that Black Grape hasn't seen before". laut.de's Michael Schuh praise Youth for meticulously making "sure that no new-fangled nonsense like trap or dubstep ends up on the record and thus makes the nostalgia performance perfect". Verrico felt that Youth "attempted to keep their naughty-schoolboy side in check", which he "mostly manages by swathing Shaun Ryder’s rants and Kermit’s raps in funky brass and good-time grooves".

Pop Voodoo charted at number eight in Scotland and number 15 in the UK.

Track listing
All songs written by Shaun Ryder, Paul Leveridge and Martin Glover.

Personnel
Personnel per booklet.

Black Grape
 Shaun Ryder – vocals
 Paul "Kermit" Leveridge – vocals

Additional musicians
 Martin "Youth" Glover  – programming, Fender VI bass, guitar
 Michael Rendall – keyboards, guitar, programming
 Seth Leppard – guitar
 Alex Ward – saxophone
 Jamie Grashion – programming, guitar
 Rainbow Man – harmonica
 Jackson Scott – acoustic guitar

Production and design
 Youth – producer, mixing
 Michael Rendall – recording, mixing, additional production
 Jamie Grashion – assistant engineer
 Luke Fitzpatrick – assistant engineer
 Mike Marsh – mastering
 Jon Gray – illustration
 Estuary English – design

Charts

References
Citations

Sources

External links

 Pop Voodoo at YouTube (streamed copy where licensed)

2017 albums
Black Grape albums
Albums produced by Youth (musician)